Oh Kwang-Soo (Hangul: 오광수) (born October 30, 1965 in Goheung, Jeollanam-do) is a former South Korean boxer.

Amateur career
In 1985, Oh won the light flyweight gold medal at the Boxing World Cup. He defeated 1983 Pan American Games gold medalist Rafael Ramos in the semifinal bout.

In 1986, Oh won the bronze medal at the World Amateur Boxing Championships. In the preliminary bout, he beat Róbert Isaszegi, who won bronze at the 1988 Olympics, by RSC, scoring three knockdowns in the first round.

Oh competed at the 1988 Summer Olympics where he was a favorite to medal, however, he was eliminated in his first bout by a narrow 3–2 decision against eventual silver medalist and future hall of fame champion Michael Carbajal. Oh had defeated Carbajal by a 3-0 margin in a previous meeting.

Results

Pro career

In February 1990, Oh made his pro debut in minimumweight, and after only six fights challenged Ricardo Lopez for the WBC minimumweight title on January 31, 1993. However, he was TKO'd in the 9th round. Oh had struggled to make weight to minimumweight, and eventually retired after the bout with a record of 6-1-0 without moving up a weight class.

References

External links
sports-reference

Living people
Boxers at the 1988 Summer Olympics
Olympic boxers of South Korea
1965 births
Asian Games medalists in boxing
Boxers at the 1986 Asian Games
South Korean male boxers
AIBA World Boxing Championships medalists
Asian Games gold medalists for South Korea
Medalists at the 1986 Asian Games
Light-flyweight boxers
People from Goheung County